Nadezhda Mikhaylovna Medvedeva (6 October 1832, Moscow, Imperial Russia,—24 September 1899, Corfu, Greece) was a Russian stage actress associated with Maly Theatre in Moscow.

Life 
A  daughter of the actress Akulina Medvedeva (1796-1895) and a Mikhail Shchepkin's student, Nadezhda Medvedeva made her successful debut on stage at age 14 as Agnesa in Moliere's L'École des femmes but for a while remained shadowed by stars like Lyubov Nikulina-Kositskaya, Ekaterina Vasilyeva and Nadezhda Rykalova. In 1854, after a two-year stint at the Odessa Theatre she returned to become Maly's leading actress but made her  breakthrough later in the plays by Alexander Ostrovsky who wrote several parts (like that of Gurmyzhskaya in The Forest) especially for her.

Medvedeva trained a young Maria Yermolova, while Konstantin Stanislavski drew inspiration from her performances at the Maly at the beginning of his career, describing her as his "teacher."

References 

19th-century actresses from the Russian Empire
Actresses from Moscow
1832 births
1899 deaths